Vlad Nistor may refer to:
 Vlad Nistor (rugby union) (born 1994), Romanian rugby union player
 Vlad Nistor (politician), Romanian politician